Michal Novotný (born 1985) is a Czech art curator, critic and writer. He is the Director of the Collection of Modern and Contemporary Art at National Gallery Prague.

Biography 
Novotný studied art history, philosophy, and anthropology at Charles University in Prague.

Novotný's researches focus on the question of central-eastern Europe identity and how the notion of quality art is constructed in regard of the material conditions. These researches transcribed themselves into the serie of Orient exhibitions as much as his dramaturgy at Futura Center of Contemporary art.

Novotný served as director of the Centre for Contemporary Art FUTURA in Prague from 2011 to 2018. In 2016, the website Artsy listed him as among the 20 most influential young curators in Europe. From 2016 to 2018, he was also an external curator at the Plato City Gallery in Ostrava.  

In 2018, Novotný became director of Modern and Contemporary Art collection at the National Gallery Prague. His nomination by Jiří Fajt was a surprise and was controversial because of his lack of a doctorate. In 2020, he curated a retrospective for sculptor  at the National Gallery. 

Novotný’s independent exhibitions include the group exhibition series Orient, consisting of the exhibitions Orient (2018), Orient2 (2019), and Orient V (2019), which explore Eastern/Central European identities.

Michal Novotný teaches painting at the Academy of Arts, Architecture and Design, Umprum.

References 

1985 births
Living people
Czech art critics
European art curators
Charles University alumni
Czech curators
Academic staff of the Academy of Arts, Architecture and Design in Prague